WPRC may refer to:

 WPFC (AM), a radio station (1550 AM) licensed to Baton Rouge, Louisiana, United States
 Wellington Phoenix FC, a football club
 West Perth Football Club, an Australian Rules Football Team in Western Australia
 Wodson Park F.C.
 Worcester Park F.C.
 Worksop Parramore F.C.